Vyacheslav Borysenko (born 24 March 2002) is a professional Ukrainian football goalkeeper who plays for Oleksandriya in the Ukrainian Premier League.

Career
Borysenko is a product of the Feniks Zhytomyr and UFK-Karpaty Lviv youth sportive school systems.

From August 2019 he played for the side Oleksandriya in the Ukrainian Premier League Reserves and Under 19 Championship during four seasons. In July 2020 he was promoted to the main squad to play in the Ukrainian Premier League. Borysenko made his debut in the Ukrainian Premier League for FC Oleksandriya as a start squad player on 18 October 2020, playing in a winning home match against FC Inhulets Petrove.

References

External links
Statistics at UAF website (Ukr)
 

2002 births
Living people
Ukrainian footballers
Association football goalkeepers
FC Oleksandriya players
FC Enerhiya Nova Kakhovka players
Ukrainian Premier League players
Ukrainian Second League players